Arthur Tavares was an American actor and film editor who was active in Hollywood from the 1910s through the 1930s.

Biography 
Arthur was born in San Francisco to Jayme Tavares and Maria Botelho, both of whom were Portuguese immigrants. During the 1910s, Tavares appeared as an actor in silent films in Hollywood. During the 1920s, he changed gears and became an editor. At the beginning of the sound era, Tavares worked on Spanish-language versions of American films. He also made a number of films in Britain, including The Wrecker, The First Born and Song of Freedom.

Partial filmography

Actor
 The Spanish Jade (1915)
The Chef's Revenge (1915)
 Ramona (1916)
The Eyes of the World (1917 film)
 The Savage (1917)
 Hungry Eyes (1918)
 Fortune's Mask (1922)

Editor
 Lilies of the Field (1924)
 Chickie (1925)
 The Unguarded Hour (1925)
 Puppets (1926)
 The First Born (1928)
 The Wrecker (1929)
 Shadows of Glory (1930)
 Thus is Life (1930)
 Drácula (1931)
 East of Borneo (1931)
 Strictly Dishonorable (1931)
 Sally Bishop (1932)
 Ten Minute Alibi (1935)
 Charing Cross Road (1935)
 Song of Freedom (1936)

Bibliography
 Low, Rachael. History of the British Film, 1918-1929. George Allen & Unwin, 1971.
 Nollen, Scott Allen. Paul Robeson: Film Pioneer. McFarland, 2010.

References

External links

1884 births
1954 deaths
American male silent film actors
Male actors from San Francisco
20th-century American male actors
American film editors